The Sunday Graphic was an English tabloid newspaper published in Fleet Street.

The newspaper was founded in 1915 as the Sunday Herald and was later renamed the Illustrated Sunday Herald.  In 1927 it changed its name to the Sunday Graphic, becoming the sister paper of the Daily Graphic.  In 1931 it was merged with the Sunday News.  It ceased publication on 4 December 1960.

Editors
1926: T. Hill
1931: Alan Sinclair
1935: Reginald Simpson
1947: M. Watts
1947: N. Hamilton
1948: Iain Lang
1949: A. J. Josey
1950: Barry Horniblow
1952: Philip Brownrigg
1953: Mike Randall
1953: Gordon McKenzie
1958: Allan Hall
1959: Robert Anderson
1960: Andrew Ewart

Source: David Butler and Anne Sloman, British Political Facts, 1900-1979, p. 445

References

Defunct newspapers published in the United Kingdom
Publications established in 1915
Publications disestablished in 1960
1915 establishments in the United Kingdom